Sangsa-myeon, also called Sangsa Township or Sangsa for short, is a myeon (township) in Suncheon, a city in the South Jeolla Province, South Korea. The population is 2989 people, 1501 males and 1488 females, and the number of houses total 1334. The township office is located in 330, Sangsaho-gil in Heulsan-ri. There are Hyang-dong, Namje-dong, and Dosa-dong in the east of the township; Nagan-myeon in the west; Byeollyang-myeon in the south; and Seungju-eup in the north. Mountains in the township are Oknyeobong (옥녀봉) with the height  on the border to Seungju-eup, and Undongsan (운동산) with the height  on the border to Byeollyang-myeon, etc. Rivers in the township are Isacheon (이사천), Sangsacheon (상사천), Chogokcheon (초곡천), and Seokheungcheon (석흥천), etc. It also has Sangsa branch dam of Juam dam.

History 

It was in Gampyeong-gun in the Baekje. It was in Suncheon-mok in the Goryeo. It became Maejae-gol, Suncheon-bu in Joseon. It became Sangsa-myeon, Suncheon-gun on the 32nd year of Gojong of Joseon (1895 CE). It became Sangsa-myeon, Seungju-gun on 15 August 1945. It became Sangsa-myeon, Suncheon-si on 1 January 1995.

Ri 

Seo-myeon has eleven jurisdictions, twenty-five administrative districts, and thirty bans.

Dowol-ri 

Dowol-ri has only one administrative district: Migok-ri (미곡리).

Maryun-ri 

Maryun-ri has two administrative districts: Maryun-ri (마륜리), and Hwasumok-ri (화수목리).

Bongrae-ri 

Bongrae-ri has only one administrative district: Nodong-ri (노동리).

Bichon-ri 

Bichon-ri has two administrative districts: Bichon-ri (비촌리), and Seodong-ri (서동리).

Ssangji-ri 

Ssangji-ri has three administrative districts: Ssangji-ri (쌍지리), Eoeun-ri (어은리), and Ungok-ri (운곡리).

Ogok-ri 

Ogok-ri has two administrative districts: Ogok-ri (오곡리), and Yeondong-ri (연동리).

Yonggye-ri 

Yonggye-ri has two administrative districts: Yonggye-ri (용계리), and Gugye-ri (구계리).

Yongam-ri 

Yongam-ri has two administrative districts: Hoeryong-ri (회룡리), and Yongam-ri (용암리).

Eungnyeong-ri 

Eungnyeong-ri has four administrative districts: Eungnyeong-ri (응령리), Geumgok-ri (금곡리), Munhwa-ri (문화리), and Seojeong-ri (서정리).

Chogok-ri 

Chogok-ri has two administrative districts: Chogok-ri (초곡리), and Gidong-ri (기동리).

Heulsan-ri 

Heulsan-ri has four administrative districts: Heulsan-ri (흘산리), Dangchon-ri (당촌리), Icheon-ri (이천리), and Dongbaek-ri (동백리). It has township office on 330, Sangsaho-gil.

References

External links 
 Sangsa-myeon office 

Suncheon
Towns and townships in South Jeolla Province